Justice Samuel Adjei is a Ghanaian politician and the former deputy Brong Ahafo Regional Minister of Ghana.

References

National Democratic Congress (Ghana) politicians